Sextet is an album by American composer, bandleader and keyboardist Carla Bley released on the Watt/ECM label in 1987.

Reception

Allmusic awarded the album 3 stars with a review by Richard S. Ginell stating, "The sound bathes in a polished golden ambience very much in keeping with a product distributed under the ECM banner". The Penguin Guide to Jazz awarded the album 2½ stars.

Track listing
All compositions by Carla Bley.
 "More Brahms" - 7:31  
 "Houses and People" - 7:26  
 "The Girl Who Cried Champagne" - 6:08  
 "Brooklyn Bridge" - 6:35  
 "Lawns" - 7:06  
 "Healing Power" - 6:22

Personnel
Carla Bley - organ, synth bass (track 2)
Larry Willis - piano 
Hiram Bullock - guitar, bass guitar (track 4)
Steve Swallow - bass guitar  
Victor Lewis - drums
Don Alias - percussion

References

ECM Records albums
Carla Bley albums
1987 albums